The Open Isla de Lanzarote was a tennis tournament held in Puerto del Carmen, Lanzarote, Spain, between 2006 and 2008. The event was part of the ''challenger series and was played on outdoor hard courts. After 2008, the tournament was cancelled in favour of the Open Costa Adeje – Isla de Tenerife-Tournament.

Past finals

Singles

Doubles

External links 
Official website
ITF search

ATP Challenger Tour
Recurring sporting events established in 2006
Sport in Lanzarote
Lan